On April 27, 1981, the Red Brigades kidnapped the 60-year-old Christian Democrat (DC) politician Ciro Cirillo and killed his two-man escort in the garage of his Naples apartment building. At the time Cirillo directed reconstruction efforts in Campania devastated by the earthquake in the Irpinia region on November 23, 1980. He was released after a controversial deal with the Camorra.

Natural target
Cirillo was a key figure in the Campanian regional DC hierarchy. He was the right-hand man of Antonio Gava – one of the national leaders of the Doroteo faction of the DC –, responsible for appointments and public works contracts, and someone who knew a great deal about all the ‘behind the scenes’ deals of local Neapolitan politics. As the regional councillor for urban planning, he was in charge of the reconstruction after the 1980 earthquake.

After two and a half months, the Red Brigades threatened to execute Cirillo unless the Naples city government accepted demands it refused in the past. The Red Brigades demanded that the authorities requisitioned housing for thousands of Naples families left homeless by the earthquake. They also demanded increased benefits for the unemployed. None of the political demands of the Red Brigades were met and in the end they accepted that a ransom was enough to release Cirillo.

Release
Cirillo was released after 89 days on July 25, 1981, against the payment of a ransom of one and a half billion lire, thanks to the decisive intervention of Camorra boss Raffaele Cutolo. Publicly the Christian Democrats had refused to negotiate with terrorists, but privately leading politicians such as Antonio Gava and Vincenzo Scotti, and members of the secret services, such as Pietro Musumeci, visited Cutolo in prison and asked him to negotiate with imprisoned members of the Red Brigades.

In return, Cutolo allegedly asked for a slackening of police operations against the Camorra, for control over the tendering of building contracts in Campania (a lucrative venture since the devastating earthquake in November 1980) and for a reduction of his own sentence – as well as new psychiatric test to show that he is not responsible for his actions. Both these last concessions were granted.

Aftermath
The outcome of the Cirillo kidnap stood in sharp contrast to the kidnap of the Italian former Prime Minister Aldo Moro. When Moro was abducted by the Red Brigades in 1978, the Christian Democrats in government immediately took a hardline position: the "State must not bend" on terrorist demands. They refused to negotiate with the Red Brigades, while local Christian Democrats in Campania made every effort and even negotiated with criminals to release Cirillo, a relatively minor politician in comparison with Moro.

Cirillo died on 30 July 2017 at age 96.

See also
List of kidnappings
List of solved missing person cases

References

Books
Allum, Percy & Felia Allum, The resistible rise of the new Neapolitan Camorra, in Stephen Gundle & Simon Parker (eds) (1996), The New Italian Republic. From the Fall of the Berlin Wall to Berlusconi, New York: Routledge 
Behan, Tom (2002), See Naples and Die: The Camorra and Organized Crime, London/New York: I.B. Tauris Publishers, 
Haycraft, John (1985). The Italian Labyrinth: Italy in the 1980s, London: Secker & Warburg
Stille, Alexander (1995). Excellent Cadavers. The Mafia and the Death of the First Italian Republic, New York: Vintage 

1980s missing person cases
1981 murders in Italy
20th century in Naples
April 1981 crimes
April 1981 events in Europe
Communist terrorism
Crime in Naples
Formerly missing people
History of the Camorra in Italy
Kidnappings in Italy
Kidnapped Italian people
Missing person cases in Italy
Organized crime events in Italy
Terrorist incidents in Italy in 1981